"Wish You Were Here" is a song by English rock band Pink Floyd. It was released as the title track of their 1975 album of the same name. David Gilmour and Roger Waters collaborated in writing the music, with Gilmour singing lead vocals.

The song is popular on classic rock radio stations. It was voted the 18th best rock song of all time by listeners of New York City’s Q104.3, and ranked No. 302 on [[Rolling Stone's 500 Greatest Songs of All Time|Rolling Stones 500 Greatest Songs of All Time]], both in 2021.

Composition
In the original album version, the song segues from "Have a Cigar" as if a radio had been tuned away from one station, through several others (including a radio play and one playing the opening of the finale of Pyotr Ilyich Tchaikovsky's Fourth Symphony), and finally to a new station where "Wish You Were Here" is beginning. The radio was recorded from Gilmour's car radio. He performed the intro on a twelve-string guitar, processed to sound like it was playing through an AM radio, and then overdubbed a fuller-sounding acoustic guitar solo. This passage was mixed to sound as though a guitarist were listening to the radio and playing along. As the acoustic part becomes more complex, the "radio broadcast" fades away and Gilmour's voice enters, while the rest of the band joins in.

The intro riff is repeated several times before Gilmour plays further solos with scat singing accompaniment. A third verse follows, featuring an increasingly expressive vocal from Gilmour and audible backing vocals. At the end of the recorded song, the final solo crossfades with wind sound effects, and finally segues into the second section of the multi-part suite "Shine On You Crazy Diamond".

Lyrically, the song is often considered to be a direct tribute to Syd Barrett. However, on the documentary The Story of Wish You Were Here, Gilmour and Waters separately describe the original concept that differs from this interpretation. Waters, who mainly wrote the lyrics complementing Gilmour's initial riff idea and subsequent joint composition, describes the lyrics as being directed at himself, as his lyrics often are. Being present in one's own life and freeing one's self in order to truly experience life is a main topic in this song. Gilmour, on the other hand, recognizes that he never performs the song without remembering Syd Barrett. Waters later adds that the song is nevertheless open to interpretation.

Both Gilmour and Waters have praised the song as one of Pink Floyd's finest. Waters has noted that the collaboration between himself and Gilmour on the song was "really good. All bits of it are really, really good. I'm very happy about it." Gilmour has playfully called "Wish You Were Here" "a very simple country song" and stated that "because of its resonance and the emotional weight it carries, it is one of our best songs."

Recording
"Wish You Were Here" was recorded at Abbey Road Studios, as part of the sessions for the entire album.

A noted part of the song was a planned contribution by Stéphane Grappelli. A jazz violinist popular at the time and well known for his collaborations with Yehudi Menuhin, both violinists were recording in a downstairs studio at Abbey Road at the time. Gilmour had suggested that there be a little "country fiddle" at the end of the song and invited them to participate. Ultimately during mixing it was decided to almost remove his contribution, although it can just be heard around 5:21. According to Waters it was decided that it would be insulting to credit Grappelli in the sleeve notes for something so inaudible, although he did receive the agreed-upon fee.

In the introduction, Gilmour can be heard coughing followed by some breathing right before the main guitar comes in. Legend has it that he could not hold in the cough due to his heavy smoking at the time. When he heard the final take, he was so disappointed, he quit smoking cold turkey the following day.

As part of the Why Pink Floyd...? campaign, the Experience and Immersion versions of the Wish You Were Here album include an alternative version of the song where Grappelli's part is heard in the instrumental break after the second verse and throughout the third verse before a considerably extended outro. Other less obvious differences are audible, for example at the section leading into the second verse.

The master tape of the original recording includes guitar solos that were not used in the final mix.

Live performances
In 2005, Waters and Eric Clapton performed the song at the Tsunami Aid concert, and in 2005's Live 8, Waters rejoined his former bandmates in London to perform it, along with four other classic Pink Floyd songs. Waters and Gilmour shared lead vocals. 

On 13 December 2014 Gilmour was a guest performer at a concert by the Bombay Bicycle Club at Earls Court Arena, their concert being the final event ever to take place there before its demolition.  Band member Jamie MacColl introduced Gilmour, saying; "This man gave me my first guitar and was one of the first people to play this venue and by my count has played here more than 27 times." Gilmour then played with the band on their song "Rinse Me Down" before a performance of "Wish You Were Here".

Other recorded versions by Pink Floyd
"Wish You Were Here" appeared as the fifth track on A Collection of Great Dance Songs in 1981 (with the radio intro following the end of a heavily edited "Shine On You Crazy Diamond") and as the 23rd track on the Echoes compilation in 2001 (with the radio intro following "Arnold Layne", and at the end crossfading with "Jugband Blues").

A live recording included on the 1995 live album Pulse was issued as a single/EP. Its intro replicates the sound of the original, semi-ambient intro. The cover of the EP features two men whose faces are distorted by fish bowls, referring to the line "We're just two lost souls swimming in a fish bowl, year after year".

The Experience edition of Wish You Were Here from the 2011 Why Pink Floyd...? re-release campaign includes a version of "Wish You Were Here" featuring Stéphane Grappelli on violin much more prominently. The recording of Grappelli, which Mason had thought he might have recorded over in subsequent sessions for "Wish You Were Here", was uncovered in the EMI vaults during re-mastering work for the Why Pink Floyd...? campaign. Mason discussed the alternative version on the BBC Radio 4 Front Row programme, and revealed that Yehudi Menuhin, who was recording with Grappelli in Abbey Road's Studio Two, was also invited to play on "Wish You Were Here" but declined, as he was not as comfortable as Grappelli at improvising.

Personnel

 Pink Floyd 
David Gilmour – lead and harmony vocals, scat singing, six and twelve-string acoustic guitars, pedal steel guitar, tape effects
Nick Mason – drums, tape effects
Roger Waters – bass, tape effects
Richard Wright – Steinway piano, Minimoog
 Additional musicians 
Stéphane Grappelli - violin improvisation

Charts

Certifications

Wish You Were Here (Live)

"Wish You Were Here (Live)" is a live recording of Pink Floyd's title track off their ninth studio album Wish You Were Here, recorded by the band for their third live album, Pulse. "Wish You Were Here (Live)" was released as a single on 20 July 1995 in the United Kingdom and Europe, notably the last single released by the band until October 2014.

Track listing

Charts

Release history

Wyclef Jean version

"Wish You Were Here" served as the fourth and final single from Haitian rapper Wyclef Jean's second studio album, The Ecleftic: 2 Sides II a Book (2001). It was released on 26 November 2001, peaking at number 28 on the UK Singles Chart and reaching the top 50 in Germany, Ireland, Norway, and Switzerland.

Track listingsUK CD single 
 "Wish You Were Here" (radio edit) – 4:04
 "No Woman, No Cry" (album version) – 4:33
 "911" (live) – 4:23
 "Wish You Were Here" (video)UK cassette single 
 "Wish You Were Here" (LP version) – 4:08
 "Perfect Gentleman" (remix radio edit) – 3:59European CD single''' 
 "Wish You Were Here" (radio edit) – 4:04
 "911" (live) – 4:23

Charts

Cultural references
 The album The Dark Side of the Moog'' (1994) by Klaus Schulze and Pete Namlook is subtitled "Wish you were there".

References

External links

 Pink Floyd's version on Last.fm
 Wyclef Jean's version on Last.fm

1970s ballads
1975 songs
1995 singles
2001 singles
Pink Floyd songs
Wyclef Jean songs
Songs written by David Gilmour
Songs written by Roger Waters
Song recordings produced by David Gilmour
Song recordings produced by Roger Waters
Song recordings produced by Richard Wright (musician)
Song recordings produced by Nick Mason
Song recordings produced by Jerry Duplessis
Live singles
Capitol Records singles
EMI Records singles
Columbia Records singles
Songs about Syd Barrett
Rock ballads